Government College may refer to:

Bangladesh
 Narsingdi Government College]], Narsingdi
 Begum Badrunnesa Government Girls' College
 Chittagong College, also called Chittagong Government College
 Comilla Government College
 Govt. Edward College, Pabna
 Government Hazi Mohammad Mohshin College, Chittagong
 Government Physical Education College, Dhaka
 Government Saadat College, Tangail
 Government Science College, Dhaka
 Government Tolaram College, Narayanganj
 Government Unani and Ayurvedic Degree College and Hospital, Dhaka
 Jamalpur Government College
 Kabi Nazrul Government College
 Kurigram Government College
 Lalmonirhat Government College
 New Government Degree College, Rajshahi
 Noakhali Government College
 Narayanganj Government Mohila College
 Government Mohammadpur Model School & College

India
 Government degree colleges in India, public sector educational institutes
 Government Intermediate College, a state-run higher secondary school
 Agartala Government Medical College
 Alagappa Government Arts College, Karaikudi
 Babu Shobha Ram Government. Arts College, Alwar
 Barasat Government College
 CBP Government Engineering College
 Darjeeling Government College
 Dera Natung Government College
 Diphu Government College
 Dr. Ambedkar Government Law College, Chennai
 Dr. V. M. Government Medical College, Solapur
 Durgapur Government College
 Government Arts College, Coimbatore
 Government Arts College, Kumbakonam
 Government Arts College, Ooty
 Government Arts College, Rajahmundry
 Government Autonomous College, Angul
 Government Autonomous College, Bhawanipatna
 Government College, Ajmer
 Government College, Chittur
 Government College, Kattappana
 Government College, Kottayam
 Government College, Manimalakkunnu
 Government College, Sanjauli
 Government College of Architecture, Lucknow
 Government College of Art & Craft, Kolkata
 Government College of Arts, Science and Commerce, Khandola
 Government College of Arts & Science (Surandai)
 Government College of Education, Chandigarh
 Government College of Engineering, Amravati
 Government College of Engineering, Aurangabad
 Government College of Engineering, Bargur
 Government College of Engineering, Kannur
 Government College of Engineering, Karad
 Government College of Engineering, Salem
 Government College of Engineering, Tirunelveli
 Government College of Engineering & Textile Technology, Berhampore
 Government College of Engineering & Textile Technology Serampore
 Government College of Engineering and Ceramic Technology, Kolkata
 Government College of Engineering and Leather Technology, Kolkata
 Government College of Engineering and Technology, Jammu
 Government College of Fine Arts, Chennai
 Government College of Technology, Coimbatore
 Government Colleges Hostel, Mumbai
 Government Degree College Kathua
 Government Dental College, Bangalore
 Government Engineering College, Ajmer
 Government Engineering College, Bhavnagar
 Government Engineering College, Gandhinagar
 Government Engineering College, Idukki, Painavu
 Government Engineering College, Jhalawar
 Government Engineering College, Kozhikode
 Government Engineering College, Rewa
 Government Engineering College, Sreekrishnapuram
 Government Engineering College, Thrissur
 Government Engineering College, Wayanad
 Government Girls P.G. College, Chhatarpur
 Government Homoeopathic Medical College, Calicut
 Government Law College, Calicut
 Government Law College, Coimbatore
 Government Law College, Ernakulam
 Government Law College, Mumbai
 Government Law College, Thiruvananthapuram
 Government Law College, Thrissur
 Government Law College, Tiruchirapalli
 Government Maharaja P.G. College, Chhatarpur
 Government Mahila Engineering College
 Government Medical College, Akola
 Government Medical College, Amritsar
 Government Medical College, Anantapur
 Government Medical College, Aurangabad
 Government Medical College, Kota
 Government Medical College, Kottayam
 Government Medical College, Latur
 Government Medical College, Thiruvananthapuram
 Government Medical College, Thrissur
 Government Medical College, Patiala
 Government Nizamia Tibbi College, Hyderabad
 Government Pharmacy College, Bangalore
 Government Polytechnic College, Nagercoil
 Government Sanskrit College, Varanasi
 Government Serchhip College
 Government Victoria College, Palakkad
 Jalpaiguri Government Engineering College
 Jawaharlal Nehru Government Engineering College, Sundernagar
 Jawaharlal Nehru Rajkeeya Mahavidyalaya, Port Blair, Andaman and Nicobar Islands
 Kalyani Government Engineering College
 Kanyakumari Government Medical College
 Loganatha Narayanasamy Government Arts College, Ponneri
 Maharajah's Government College of Music and Dance
 NJSA Government College, Kapurthala
 P. V. K. N. Government College
 Purulia Government Engineering College
 Quaid-e-Millath Government College for Women
 Ramabai Government Women Post Graduate College, Ambedkar Nagar
 Satish Chander Dhawan Government College For Boys
 Shri Bhausaheb Hire Government Medical College, Dhule
 Shri Kalyan Government College, Sikar
 Shri Vasantrao Naik Government Medical College, Yavatmal
 Silver Jubilee Government Degree College, Kurnool
 Sri C. Achutha Menon Government College
 Taki Government College
 Vedavathi Government First Grade College, Karnataka
 Vishwakarma Government Engineering College, Chandkheda

Nigeria
 Government College, Ibadan
 Government College Ikorodu
 Government College Umuahia

Pakistan
 Government College University, Lahore, probably the college most frequently referred to by this name
 Government College Hyderabad, Sindh
 Government M.A.O College Lahore
 Adamjee Government Science College, Karachi
 Government College, Pattoki
 Government College Asghar Mall Rawalpindi
 Government College Ground Mirpur
 Government College Muzaffargarh
 Government College University, Faisalabad
 Government College for Men Nazimabad, Karachi
 Government College for Women Dhoke Kala Khan, Rawalpindi
 Government College of Commerce & Economics, Karachi
 Government College of Science, Lahore
 Government College of Technology, Bahawalpur
 Government College of Technology, Faisalabad
 Government Degree College Attock
 Government Khawaja Farid College, Rahim Yar Khan
 Government National College (Karachi)
 Government Post Graduate College Sahiwal
 Government Post Graduate College, Swabi
 Government Post Graduate College For Girls–Chishtian
 Government Premier College, Karachi
 Rana Liaquat Ali Khan Government College of Home Economics
 Sir Syed Government Girls College, Karachi

Sri Lanka

See also
 Federal Government College (disambiguation)
 Government College for Women (disambiguation)
 Government College of Technology (disambiguation)
 Government College University (disambiguation)

References